Gordon Scott (1926–2007) was an American film and television actor.

Gordon Scott may also refer to:
Gordon Scott (basketball) (born 1976), American basketball player
Gordon Scott (politician) (1908–1965), Australian politician
Gordon Wallace Scott (1887–1940), Canadian politician

See also
Scott Gordon (disambiguation)